Ardeatino is the 20th quartiere of Rome (Italy), identified by the initials Q. XX. It belongs to the Municipio I and VIII.

Geography

Boundaries
Northward, the quartiere borders with rioni San Saba (R. XXI) and Celio (R. XIX). Eastward, it borders with the quartiere Appio-Latino (Q. IX) and Appio-Pignatelli (Q. XXVI). Southeastward, it borders with the zona Torricola (Z. XXI). Southward, it borders with the zona Cecchignola (Z. XXII) and quartiere Giuliano-Dalmata (Q. XXXI). Westward, it borders with the quartiere Europa (Q. XXXII) and Ostiense (Q. X).

Churches
Annunciazione della Beata Vergine Maria a Via Ardeatina

References

External links